Henry Potter (January 5, 1766 – December 20, 1857) was the longest-serving United States federal judge to sit on a single court and the longest-serving judge in active service. Potter served as a United States circuit judge of the United States Circuit Court for the Fifth Circuit and as a United States district judge of the United States District Court for the Albemarle, Cape Fear and Pamptico Districts of North Carolina.

Education and career

Born on January 5, 1766, in Mecklenburg County, Colony of Virginia, British America, Potter read law circa 1790. He engaged in private practice in Raleigh, North Carolina from circa 1792 to 1802.

Federal judicial service

Potter received a recess appointment from President Thomas Jefferson on May 9, 1801, to the United States Circuit Court for the Fifth Circuit, to a new seat authorized by 2 Stat. 89. He was nominated to the same position by President Jefferson on January 6, 1802. He was confirmed by the United States Senate on January 26, 1802, and received his commission the same day. His service terminated on April 7, 1802, due to his appointment to another judicial position.

Potter was nominated by President Jefferson on April 6, 1802, to a seat on the United States District Court for the Albemarle, Cape Fear & Pamptico Districts of North Carolina (also referenced officially as the United States District Court for the District of North Carolina) vacated by Judge John Sitgreaves. He was confirmed by the Senate on April 7, 1802, and received his commission the same day. His service terminated on December 20, 1857, due to his death in Fayetteville, North Carolina.

Other service

Potter became a trustee of the University of North Carolina in 1799, and held that position until his death. He published various books, including an 1816 tract on the Duties of a Justice of the Peace, and, with John Louis Taylor and Bartlett Yancey, an 1821 revision of the two-volume Law of the State of North Carolina.

Family

Potter was born to John Potter and Mary Howard Hawkins. He moved with his parents to Granville County, Province of North Carolina, British America (State of North Carolina, United States from July 4, 1776), where is spent his childhood. Potter married Sylvania Williams in 1799.

See also
 List of United States federal judges by longevity of service

References

Further reading 

1766 births
1857 deaths
19th-century American judges
Judges of the United States circuit courts
Judges of the United States District Court for the District of North Carolina
People from Mecklenburg County, Virginia
United States federal judges appointed by Thomas Jefferson
United States federal judges admitted to the practice of law by reading law
People from Granville County, North Carolina